Indermark  is a village in the Capricorn District Municipality in the Limpopo province of South Africa. The village is situated in the Blouberg Local Municipality.

The settlement is approximately 89 km north-west of Polokwane, on the route to Vivo.

Railways

Indermark is not connected to any railway but people want to connect in order to transport food to Johannesburg and other major centres via rail. Agricultural produce in the area, including tomatoes, bananas and avocados, is also transported via freight rail.

Media
The South African Broadcasting Corporation has neglected the people on the demand for branch located in the village.

The South African census showed the population of Village City as 53,028 with 33,84 households in the 2011 census.

References
6. "Mahlatse Totem"
Indermark born & raised multi talented entrepreneur

External links
 
 Capricorn District Municipality website

Populated places in the Blouberg Local Municipality
Populated places founded by Afrikaners
Establishments in the South African Republic